The 2021 Legends Tour was the 30th season of the European Senior Tour, the professional golf tour for men aged 50 and above operated by the PGA European Tour. It was the first season since rebranding as the Legends Tour.

Schedule 
The following table lists official events during the 2021 season.

Unofficial events
The following events were sanctioned by the European Senior Tour, but did not carry official money, nor were wins official.

Qualifying school
There was no qualifying school for the 2021 season. The five players who qualified for the cancelled 2020 European Senior Tour season had their playing rights rolled over to the 2021 season.

Order of Merit leaders
A points-based system was used instead of one based on prize money. Tournaments had different points values with the three majors carrying 10,000 points and the remaining 16 events carrying between 2,500 and 4,500 points.

There is a complete list on the official site here.

Notes

References

External links 

European Senior Tour
European Senior Tour